And Then We Met Impero is the name of the second EP of the Italian alternative rock band Meganoidi.

On this record, for the first time, the band deviates significantly from the preceding ska-core sounds, to arrive at Math rock and Progressive rock that will keep well in the following records.

Track listing

 And - 2:16
 Then - 7:58
 We - 5:13
 Met - 1:55
 Impero - 8:05

References

Meganoidi albums
2005 EPs